Konstantin Rashidovich Kadeyev (born 17 January 1989) is a former Russian professional football player.

Club career
He made his Russian Football National League debut for FC Dynamo Bryansk on 10 August 2010 in a game against FC Krasnodar.

External links
 
 
 Player page by sportbox.ru

1989 births
Footballers from Moscow
Living people
Russian footballers
Association football defenders
FC Spartak Moscow players
FC Dynamo Bryansk players
FC Tyumen players
FC Sever Murmansk players